E.N.O.T. Corp. (often written as ENOT Corp) is a Russian private military company founded by Igor Mangushev.

It has undertaken mercenary work in Ukraine, Syria, and Nagorno-Karabakh.

Etymology 
E.N.O.T. is an acronym of the organisation's full name, . Enot is Russian for racoon, the same symbol the group uses as a logo.

The organisation is sometimes known as the Yenot or Racoon PMC.

History and activities 
E.N.O.T. was founded in 2011 by Russian nationalist and Svetlaya Rus founder Igor Mangushev to bring together various Donbas-based militias and give them a more official status and ability to process funds for fighter's salaries, pensions, and other social protections. E.N.O.T. has undertaken armed activities in Ukraine, Syria, Nagorno-Karabakh.

Since 2015, the group has been providing military training in camps in Serbia, Donbas and Belarus. Training camp participants include children aged between 12 and 18 from Russia, Montenegro, Serbia, Belarus, Transnistria and South Ossetia. The Serbian training camp, operated by Bosnian war veterans was shut down by the Serbian Ministry of Internal Affairs in 2018 citing child abuse concerns. On November 7, 2018, in response to the training of children, Russia's Federal Security Service and police force arrested members of E.N.O.T., releasing them the following day.

The official purpose was stated as the promotion and protection of patriotic youth, although as of 2018, the group had not submitted any official reports on activities. Since 2015, E.N.O.T. has received support from the Russian government for activities in Syria and Karabakh. E.N.O.T. was active in the Russo-Ukrainian War and supported the war in Donbas.

In 2021, E.N.O.T. treasurer Vladimir Morozov was sentenced to 10.5 years in prison for extortion. In 2022, organisation leader Roman Telenkevich was sentenced to 13 years in prison for organising a criminal community, extortion, and threatening to kill or cause grievous bodily harm. In early February 2023, during the Russo-Ukrainian War, founder Igor Mangushev was fatally shot in the back of the head at a Russian vehicle checkpoint in Kadiivka.

Notable members 

 Igor Mangushev
 Alexey Milchakov

See also 

 Belligerents in the Syrian civil war
 Combatants of the war in Donbas
 Rusich Group
 Wagner Group

References

External links 
E.N.O.T. Corp. - Official Website (2017 archive)
 E.N.O.T. Corp. - Instagram

Private military contractors
Paramilitary organizations based in Russia
Pro-government factions of the Syrian civil war
Russian military intervention in the Syrian civil war
Russian mercenaries
Pro-Russian militant groups
Separatist forces of the war in Donbas
Military units and formations of the 2022 Russian invasion of Ukraine
2016 establishments in Russia
2011 establishments in Russia
Organizations founded by Igor Mangushev